A snack is a type of meal. 

Snack(s) may also refer to

 Snacks (EP), a 2018 release by Jax Jones
 Snacks (Supersize), a 2019 album by Jax Jones
 "Snack" (song), a 2020 song by Keke Palmer
 Cadbury Snack, a biscuit brand
 Students Need Athletics, Culture and Kicks, see SNACK Benefit Concert
 Damon Harrison, aka Snacks, American football player

See also 
 Midnight Snack (disambiguation)
 Scooby Snacks (disambiguation)
 Snack Attack (disambiguation)
 Snacking (disambiguation)
 
 SNAC (disambiguation)